are a Japanese professional futsal club, currently playing in the F. League Division 1. The team is located in Nagoya, Aichi Prefecture, Japan. Their home ground is Takeda Teva Ocean Arena.

Season-by-season

Sponsor

Technical sponsor

 2007–2008 Topper
 2009–2016 Asics
 2016– Hummel

Official sponsor

 2007-oggi  Taiyo Yakuhin Co. Ltd.
 2007-oggi Kajima Corporation
 2010-oggi  Toho Gas
 2011–2013  Emirates
 2011-present  Kajima Corporation, Teva Pharma Japan Inc., Asiana Airlines

Trophies
AFC Futsal Club Championship: 4
Winners: 2011, 2014, 2016, 2019
F.League: 15
Winners: 2007–08, 2008–09, 2009–10, 2010–11, 2011–12, 2012–13, 2013–14, 2014–15, 2015–16, 2017–18, 2018–19, 2019–20, 2020–21, 2021–22, 2022–23
All Japan Futsal Championship: 6
Winners: 2007, 2013, 2014, 2015, 2018, 2019
F.League Ocean Cup: 9
Winners: 2010, 2011, 2012, 2013, 2014, 2017, 2018, 2019, 2022

Current players 
As of 22 September 2022

Coaches 
 2006-2007  Oscar Majikina
 2007-2008  Mario Tateyama
 2008-2013  Jose Ajiu Amarante
 2013-2016  Víctor Acosta García
 2016-2019  Pedro Costa
 2019-  Juan Francisco Fuentes Zamora

Notable former players 
 2007-2008  Ricardo Higa
 2007-2016  Wataru Kitahara
 2007-2016  Kaoru Morioka
 2009-2012  Kenichiro Kogure
 2009-2014  Hisamitsu Kawahara
 2010-2013  Ricardinho
 2011-2012  Marquinho
 2011-2016  Pedro Costa
 2012-2013  Rafael Henmi
 2012-2017  Matías Hernán Mayedonchi
 2012-  Tomoki Yoshikawa
 2018-  Shota Hoshi

References

External links

Futsal clubs in Japan
Sports teams in Nagoya
Futsal clubs established in 2006
2006 establishments in Japan